Albert Palaska Forsythe (May 24, 1830 – September 2, 1906) was a U.S. Representative from Illinois.

Biography
Born in New Richmond, Ohio, Forsythe attended the common schools and Indiana Asbury College (now DePauw University), Greencastle, Indiana. He was admitted into the Indiana conference of the Methodist Church as a traveling preacher in 1853 and served eight years. During the Civil War, Forsythe served in the Union Army as first lieutenant of Company I, Ninety-seventh Regiment, Indiana Volunteer Infantry. He moved to Illinois in 1865 and settled on a farm west of Paris, Edgar County. He took an active part in the Grange movement and served six years as master of the State Grange of Illinois.

Forsythe was elected as a Greenback to the Forty-sixth Congress (March 4, 1879 – March 3, 1881). He was an unsuccessful candidate for reelection in 1880 to the Forty-seventh Congress. He moved to Kansas in 1882 and engaged in agricultural pursuits near Liberty, Montgomery County. He served as Regent of the Kansas State Agricultural College (now Kansas State University) 1886-1892.  He moved to Independence, Kansas, where he died September 2, 1906. He was interred in Liberty Cemetery, Liberty, Kansas.

References
 Retrieved on 2009-05-07

1830 births
1906 deaths
People from New Richmond, Ohio
Methodists from Ohio
Greenback Party members of the United States House of Representatives from Illinois
People from Independence, Kansas
DePauw University alumni
Union Army officers
People of Indiana in the American Civil War